"Rise of the Eagles" is the third single from English rock band The Eighties Matchbox B-Line Disaster's second album, The Royal Society. Despite it being the third single, it was the only single released in time for the album, the previous two being released months before. In 2015 The Prodigy did a cover of the song as a bonus track on their album The Day Is My Enemy.

Track listing

CD
"Rise of the Eagles"
"We Don't Rock"
"I Could Be an Angle" (demo)

Vinyl 1
"Rise of the Eagles"
"Party Pooper"

Vinyl 2
"Rise of the Eagles"
"Alchemy"

Video
The video satirises the American presidency, with lead singer Guy McKnight seen in a president's suit with women lusting after him.

2004 singles
The Eighties Matchbox B-Line Disaster songs
2004 songs
Island Records singles